The Gazette-Mail Kanawha County Majorette and Band Festival (formerly Daily Mail) is an annual festival dedicated to the public high school marching bands and majorette corps in Kanawha County, West Virginia. It is the longest running music festival in West Virginia and is held at the University of Charleston Stadium at Laidley Field in Charleston at the end of September each year, typically the last Tuesday. The first event was held in 1947 and was attended by nearly 25,000 people. The event was originally sponsored by the Charleston Daily Mail newspaper, but is now sponsored by the Charleston Gazette-Mail after the Daily Mail merged with the Charleston Gazette in 2015. The event was not held in 2020 due to the COVID-19 pandemic. The 2022 festival was the event's 76th anniversary and the Festival Grand Champion was George Washington High School.

The JoAnn Jarrett Holland Memorial Scholarship Fund

A $2,500 scholarship was awarded to the girl who placed first in the feature twirler competition. This was an annual award given each year at the festival. The scholarship honored the memory of JoAnn Jarrett Holland, who won the competition in 1949 and 1950. Not only did she excel at this event, but she also supported it by attending the festival each year for the rest of her life. In 1973 her daughter, Kathi Holland Burton, won this competition and went on to be the feature twirler at West Virginia University for seven years. This award has since been discontinued.

WVU and Marshall exhibition shows
Every year, the Majorette and Band Festival has an exhibition show following the final high school performance before the awards ceremony. This exhibition show features one of West Virginia's only two NCAA Division I college marching bands. Originally, on the odd numbered years, West Virginia University's marching band,  "The Pride of West Virginia", would perform in exhibition while Marshall University's marching band, " The Marching Thunder ", would perform on the even numbered years. The COVID-19 pandemic in 2020 switched this, as a festival was not held that year, with WVU now performing on the even numbered years and Marshall on the odd numbered ones.

WVU's marching band began performing for the festival in 2003, while Marshall's marching band began performing for the festival in 2004. The festival acts as a great recruitment opportunity for both bands.

High school bands

There are currently eight public high schools in Kanawha County, West Virginia. All participate in the festival.

Current High Schools:
Capital High School, Charleston, West Virginia
George Washington High School, Charleston, West Virginia
Herbert Hoover High School, Falling Rock (Clendenin, West Virginia)
Nitro High School, Nitro, West Virginia
Riverside High School, Quincy (Belle, West Virginia)
St. Albans High School, St. Albans, West Virginia
Sissonville High School, Pocatalico (Sissonville, West Virginia)
South Charleston High School, South Charleston, West Virginia

Former High Schools:  
Charleston High School, Charleston, West Virginia; closed in 1989
Dunbar High School, Dunbar, West Virginia; closed in 1990
DuPont High School, DuPont City (Belle, West Virginia); closed in 1999
East Bank High School, East Bank, West Virginia; closed in 1999
Stonewall Jackson High School, Charleston, West Virginia; closed in 1989

Previous Miss Kanawha Majorettes
The title of Miss Kanawha Majorette is awarded to the one girl who is the outstanding majorette of the evening of those competing in the category. The first girl to be named Miss Kanawha Majorette was Dolores Thompson in 1947. An annual tradition of being named Miss Kanawha Majorette is returning the next year to present the award to that year's Miss Kanawha Majorette with the trophy, tiara, and bouquet of flowers. A girl cannot be named Miss Kanawha Majorette for two consecutive years, however, it is possible for a girl to be named it twice.

Juliana Kemp from South Charleston High School is the only majorette to win the title of Miss Kanawha Majorette twice, once in 2003 and again in 2005. She went on to become the Feature Twirler for West Virginia State University's "Marching Swarm" from 2006 to 2008. Another former Miss Kanawha Majorette also went on to become the Feature Twirler for West Virginia State University. Miss Kanawha Majorette 2006, Stevi Ryder, was their Feature Twirler for 2010 and was a co-Feature Twirler for 2011 and 2012.

South Charleston High School has had the most Miss Kanawha Majorette wins with a total of 10 (they had nine different girls win the title with one girl, Juliana Kemp, winning it twice). Next to them is Herbert Hoover High School with nine; then Sissonville High School and the former DuPont High School with eight; the former Charleston High School with seven; St. Albans High School, George Washington High School, Capital High School, and the former Stonewall Jackson High School are tied with six; Riverside High School has three; and Nitro High School and the former Dunbar High School and East Bank High School are tied at two.

2022 – Caroline Dysart, Herbert Hoover
2021 – Anna Payne, George Washington 
2019 – Sydney Moore, St. Albans
2018 – Gabbie Mullins, Riverside
2017 – Lauren Carnell, Capital
2016 – Carrie Long, George Washington
2015 – Kaitlyn Cline, George Washington
2014 – Olivia Carnell, Capital
2013 – Emma Rhodes, St. Albans
2012 – Taylor Freeland, George Washington
2011 – Heather Ryan, Herbert Hoover
2010 – Alexandra Ameli, George Washington
2009 – Casey Jarvis, Capital
2008 – Kandis Courtney, Riverside
2007 – Chelsea Morton, Herbert Hoover
2006 – Stevi Ryder, Herbert Hoover
2005 – Juliana Kemp, South Charleston
2004 – Mandy Jo Wingo, Riverside
2003 – Juliana Kemp, South Charleston
2002 – Ashley Parsons, Capital
2001 – Megan Tucker, Herbert Hoover
2000 – Christal Kirk, Herbert Hoover
1999 – Laura Hanna, Capital
1998 – Jessica Smith, DuPont
1997 – Kristen Tucker, Herbert Hoover
1996 – Heather Anderson, Herbert Hoover
1995 – Julie Keenan, DuPont
1994 – Beth Miller, South Charleston
1993 – Susan Booth, Sissonville
1992 – Kim Jarrett, Sissonville
1991 – Sarah Lang, Capital
1990 – Leigh Ann Dolan, Sissonville
1989 – Jill Pazerski, George Washington
1988 – Katie Hodges, Stonewall Jackson
1987 – Kristie Roberts, South Charleston
1986 – Lisa White, DuPont
1985 – Kim Randolph, Stonewall Jackson
1984 – Lori Began, South Charleston
1983 – Kim O'Conner, South Charleston
1982 – Karen Persinger, DuPont
1981 – Kelly Ellis, Charleston
1980 – Shannon Snodgrass, DuPont
1979 – Michelle Noe, Charleston
1978 – Ursula Smith, St. Albans
1977 – Donna Rowley, Sissonville
1976 – Debbie Wilkinson, Sissonville
1975 – Dawn Bailey, Sissonville
1974 – Jenny Lynn Phyllips, East Bank
1973 – Kathy Jo Light, DuPont
1972 – Bobbie Coleman, Charleston
1971 – Judy Boggess, Nitro
1970 – Kay Bennett, Charleston
1969 – Kathy Wingo, Charleston
1968 – Janie Coffman, Sissonville
1967 – Karen Schoonover, South Charleston
1966 – Donna Tickle, Stonewall Jackson
1965 – Beth Fleshman, Herbert Hoover
1964 – Betty Conner, Sissonville
1963 – Sandy Limer, East Bank
1962 – Jenny Doty, St. Albans
1961 – Phyllis Zabel, Stonewall Jackson
1960 – Jeannie Irvin, Dunbar
1959 – Patti Bostic, South Charleston
1958 – Nina Hatfield, Stonewall Jackson
1957 – Brenda Sullivan, DuPont
1956 – Frances Snyder, Nitro
1955 – Judy Thrall, Charleston
1954 – Eleanor Carney, Dunbar
1953 – Jean Thompson, St. Albans
1952 – Barbara Jean Tucker, St. Albans
1951 – Joyce Ballard, DuPont
1950 – Patty Hendrickson, Stonewall Jackson
1949 – Mathilde Bodkin, South Charleston
1948 – Phyllis Walker, Charleston
1947 – Dolores Thompson, South Charleston

Previous Festival Grand Champions
Before 1970, there was no award for Festival Grand Champion. That year was the first year the championship was awarded and Herbert Hoover High School was the first school to win the Festival Grand Championship. Prior to 2013, "The Star-Spangled Banner" was played by the previous year's Festival Grand Champion; beginning that year, the competing bands combined perform the National Anthem.

Capital High School is the only school to have won the Festival Grand Championship for 11 consecutive years (2004–2014). The second most consecutive wins is five, which is tied by Herbert Hoover High School (1980–1984) and George Washington High School (2017–2019, 2021–2022; a festival was not held in 2020 due to the COVID-19 pandemic). Capital High School also has the most total wins at 18. Next to them is George Washington High School with 13 wins; then Herbert Hoover High School with nine wins; Nitro High School with four; St. Albans High School and the former DuPont High School with three wins; and Sissonville High School and the former Charleston High School with one win. South Charleston High School, Riverside High School, and the former Dunbar High School, East Bank High School, and Stonewall Jackson High School have never won the Festival Grand Championship.

2022 – George Washington High School
2021 – George Washington High School
2019 – George Washington High School
2018 – George Washington High School
2017 – George Washington High School 
2016 – Capital High School
2015 – Nitro High School
2014 – Capital High School
2013 – Capital High School
2012 – Capital High School
2011 – Capital High School
2010 – Capital High School
2009 – Capital High School
2008 – Capital High School
2007 – Capital High School
2006 – Capital High School
2005 – Capital High School
2004 – Capital High School
2003 – Nitro High School
2002 – Capital High School
2001 – Nitro High School
2000 – George Washington High School
1999 – George Washington High School
1998 – George Washington High School
1997 – Capital High School
1996 – George Washington High School
1995 – Capital High School
1994 – George Washington High School
1993 – Capital High School
1992 – George Washington High School
1991 – George Washington High School
1990 – Capital High School
1989 – Capital High School
1988 – Herbert Hoover High School
1987 – Herbert Hoover High School
1986 – George Washington High School
1985 – DuPont High School
1984 – Herbert Hoover High School
1983 – Herbert Hoover High School
1982 – Herbert Hoover High School
1981 – Herbert Hoover High School
1980 – Herbert Hoover High School
1979 – Charleston High School
1978 – Sissonville High School
1977 – Herbert Hoover High School
1976 – Nitro High School
1975 – St. Albans High School
1974 – DuPont High School
1973 – St. Albans High School
1972 – St. Albans High School
1971 – DuPont High School
1970 – Herbert Hoover High School

References

Music festivals in West Virginia
Tourist attractions in Kanawha County, West Virginia